Maja e Shënikut is a mountain with a height of  in northern Albania, part of the Accursed Mountains range. It is situated northwest of Maja Jezercë, the highest mountain of the Accursed Mountains, and east of the village Nikç.

References

Mountains of Albania
Accursed Mountains